"Hard to Get" is a popular song written by Jack Segal, and published in 1955.

Background
The song was a hit for Gisele MacKenzie in 1955, with the orchestra conducted by Richard Maltby. The biggest hit of MacKenzie's career, it peaked at number five on Billboard's "Best Sellers in Stores" chart during the summer of that year.

References

1955 songs
1955 singles
Songs written by Jack Segal